This is a list of the governors of the province of Ghazni, Afghanistan.

Governors of Ghazni Province

See also
 List of current governors of Afghanistan

Notes

Ghazni